Allied Forces is the fifth studio album by Canadian hard rock band Triumph, released in 1981. It reached #23 on the Billboard Pop Albums chart assisted by the singles "Magic Power" and "Fight the Good Fight," which hit #8 and #18, respectively, on the US Mainstream Rock chart of 1981. The title song was the first single from the album which was released a month before the album came out. A remastered CD was first released in 1985 on MCA, then again in 1995 on the band's TRC label, and for a third time in 2004 on the band's label TML Entertainment (formerly TRC Records). It is considered their signature record.

Track listing

Personnel
 Rik Emmett – Acoustic (six and twelve string) guitar, bottleneck slide guitar, lap steel guitar, lead and background vocals
 Gil Moore – drums, percussion, lead and background vocals
 Mike Levine – bass, organ, synthesizer, piano
 Elaine Overholt – background vocals

Production
 Dave Dickson – assistant engineer
 Mike Jones – engineer
 Joe Owens – direction
 Nick Sangiamo – photography
 Ed Stone – engineer
 Mark Woods – assistant engineer
 Brian Zick – artwork, illustrations
 Bob Ludwig – mastering on original RCA LP and on the 1985 and 1995 remastered versions
 Brett Zilahi – remastering on 2004 re-issue

Charts

Certifications

External links
 Allied Forces entry at The Official Triumph Homepage

References

1981 albums
Triumph (band) albums
RCA Records albums
Attic Records albums
Albums recorded at Metalworks Studios